Epinotia is a very large genus of tortrix moths (family Tortricidae). It belongs to the tribe Eucosmini of subfamily Olethreutinae.

Species
166 species of Epinotia were considered valid as of 2009. Though many tortrix moth genera are fairly comprehensively studied, with little other than cryptic species complexes remaining undiscovered, distinct new species of Epinotia are being described every few years or so. With such a large and insufficiently known taxon, it is of course possible that the group may not be monophyletic as circumscribed here:

 Epinotia abbreviana (Fabricius, 1794)
 Epinotia abnormana Kuznetzov, 1973
 Epinotia absconditana (Walker, 1863)
 Epinotia aciculana Falkovitsh, 1965
 Epinotia albangulana (Walsingham, 1879)
 Epinotia albicapitana (Kearfott, 1907)
 Epinotia albiguttata (Oku, 1974)
 Epinotia algeriensis Chambon in Chambon, Fabre & Khemeci, 1990
 Epinotia aquila Kuznetzov, 1968
 Epinotia araea Diakonoff, 1983
 Epinotia arctostaphylana (Kearfott, 1904)
 Epinotia aridos Freeman, 1960
 Epinotia atacta Diakonoff, 1992
 Epinotia autonoma Falkovitsh, 1965
 Epinotia autumnalis Oku, 2005
 Epinotia balsameae Freeman, 1965
 Epinotia biangulana (Walsingham, 1879)
 Epinotia bicolor (Walsingham, 1900)
 Epinotia bicordana Heinrich, 1923
 Epinotia bigemina Heinrich, 1923
 Epinotia bilunana
 Epinotia bricelus Diakonoff, 1992
 Epinotia brunnichana
 Epinotia bushiensis Kawabe, 1980
 Epinotia canthonias (Meyrick, 1920)
 Epinotia caprana (Fabricius, 1798)
 Epinotia castaneana (Walsingham, 1895)
 Epinotia cedricida Diakonoff, 1969
 Epinotia celtisana (Riley, 1881)
 Epinotia cercocarpana (Dyar, 1903)
 Epinotia chloana Razowski & Wojtusiak, 2006
 Epinotia chloizans Razowski & Wojtusiak, 2006
 Epinotia cineracea Nasu, 1991
 Epinotia clasta Diakonoff, 1983
 Epinotia columbia (Kearfott, 1904)
 Epinotia contrariana (Christoph, 1882)
 Epinotia corylana McDunnough, 1925
 Epinotia coryli Kuznetzov, 1970
 Epinotia crenana (Hübner, [1817])
 Epinotia criddleana (Kearfott, 1907)
 Epinotia cruciana – willow tortrix
 Epinotia cuphulana (Herrich-Schäffer, 1851)
 Epinotia dalmatana (Rebel, 1891)
 Epinotia demarniana
 Epinotia densiuncaria Kuznetzov, 1985
 Epinotia deruptana Kennel, 1901
 Epinotia digitana Heinrich, 1923
 Epinotia dorsifraga Diakonoff, 1970
 Epinotia emarginana (Walsingham, 1879)
 Epinotia ethnica Heinrich, 1923
 Epinotia evidens Kuznetzov, 1971
 Epinotia exquisitana (Christoph, 1882)
 Epinotia festivana (Hübner, [1799])
 Epinotia fraternana (Haworth, [1811])
 Epinotia fujisawai Kawabe, 1993
 Epinotia fumoviridana Heinrich, 1923
 Epinotia gimmerthaliana (Lienig & Zeller, 1846)
 Epinotia granitana (Herrich-Schäffer, 1851)
 Epinotia granitalis (Butler, 1881)
 Epinotia hamptonana (Kearfott, 1875)
 Epinotia hesperidana Kennel, 1921
 Epinotia heucherana Heinrich, 1923
 Epinotia hopkinsana (Kearfott, 1907)
 Epinotia huroniensis Brown, 1980
 Epinotia hypsidryas (Meyrick, 1925)
 Epinotia illepidosa (Razowski & Wojtusiak, 2006)
 Epinotia immaculata Peiu & Nemes, 1968
 Epinotia immundana
 Epinotia improvisana Heinrich, 1923
 Epinotia infessana (Walsingham, 1900)
 Epinotia infuscana (Walsingham, 1879)
 Epinotia intermissa (Meyrick, 1931)
 Epinotia javierana Razowski & Pelz, 2007
 Epinotia johnsonana (Kearfott, 1907)
 Epinotia kasloana McDunnough, 1925
 Epinotia keiferana Lange, 1937
 Epinotia ketamana (Amsel, 1956)
 Epinotia kochiana (Herrich-Schäffer, 1851)
 Epinotia lanceata Razowski, 1999
 Epinotia lindana – diamondback epinotia moth
 Epinotia lomonana (Kearfott, 1907)
 Epinotia maculana
 Epinotia madderana (Kearfott, 1907)
 Epinotia majorana (Caradja, 1916)
 Epinotia medioplagata (Walsingham, 1895)
 Epinotia medioviridana (Kearfott, 1908)
 Epinotia melanosticta (Wileman & Stringer, 1929)
 Epinotia mercuriana
 Epinotia meritana Heinrich, 1923
 Epinotia miscana (Kearfott, 1907)
 Epinotia mniara Diakonoff, 1992
 Epinotia momonana (Kearfott, 1907)
 Epinotia monticola Kawabe, 1993
 Epinotia myricana McDunnough, 1933
 Epinotia nanana
 Epinotia nemorivaga (Tengstrom, 1848)
 Epinotia nigralbana (Walsingham, 1879)
 Epinotia nigralbanoidana McDunnough, 1929
 Epinotia nigricana (Herrich-Schäffer, 1851)
 Epinotia nigristriana Budashkin & Zlatkov, 2011
 Epinotia nigrovenata Razowski & Pelz, 2010
 Epinotia nisella (Clerck, 1759)
 Epinotia niveipalpa Razowski, 2009
 Epinotia nonana (Kearfott, 1907)
 Epinotia normanana Kearfott, 1907
 Epinotia notoceliana Kuznetzov, 1985
 Epinotia parki Bae, 1997
 Epinotia pentagonana Kennel, 1901
 Epinotia penthrana Bradley, 1965
 Epinotia phyloeorrhages Diakonoff, 1970
 Epinotia piceae (Issiki in Issiki & Mutuura, 1961)
 Epinotia piceicola Kuznetzov, 1970
 Epinotia pinicola Kuznetzov, 1969 
 Epinotia plumbolineana Kearfott, 1907
 Epinotia pullata (Falkovitsh in Danilevsky, Kuznetsov & Falkovitsh, 1962)
 Epinotia pulsatillana (Dyar, 1903)
 Epinotia purpuriciliana (Walsingham, 1879)
 Epinotia pusillana
 Epinotia pygmaeana – pygmy needle tortricid
 Epinotia radicana (Heinrich, 1923)
 Epinotia ramella
 Epinotia rasdolnyana (Christoph, 1882)
 Epinotia rectiplicana (Walsingham, 1879)
 Epinotia removana McDunnough, 1935
 Epinotia rubiginosana
 Epinotia rubricana Kuznetzov, 1968
 Epinotia ruidosana Heinrich, 1923
 Epinotia sagittana McDunnough, 1925
 Epinotia salicicolana Kuznetzov, 1968
 Epinotia seorsa Heinrich, 1924
 Epinotia septemberana Kearfott, 1907
 Epinotia signatana
 Epinotia signiferana Heinrich, 1923
 Epinotia silvertoniensis Heinrich, 1923
 Epinotia slovacica Patocka & Jaro, 1991
 Epinotia solandriana
 Epinotia solicitana (Walker, 1863)
 Epinotia sordidana
 Epinotia sotipena Brown, 1987
 Epinotia sperana McDunnough, 1935
 Epinotia subocellana (Donovan, [1806])
 Epinotia subplicana (Walsingham, 1879)
 Epinotia subsequana (Haworth, [1811])
 Epinotia subuculana Rebel, 1903
 Epinotia subviridis Heinrich, 1929
 Epinotia tedella
 Epinotia tenebrica Razowski & Wojtusiak, 2006
 Epinotia tenerana
 Epinotia terracoctana (Walsingham, 1879)
 Epinotia tetraquetrana (Haworth, [1811])
 Epinotia thaiensis Kawabe, 1995
 Epinotia thapsiana (Zeller, 1847)
 Epinotia tianshanensis Liu & Nasu, 1993
 Epinotia transmissana (Walker, 1863)
 Epinotia trigonella (Linnaeus, 1758)
 Epinotia trossulana (Walsingham, 1879)
 Epinotia tsugana Freeman, 1967
 Epinotia tsurugisana Oku, 2005
 Epinotia ulmi Kuznetzov, 1966
 Epinotia ulmicola Kuznetzov, 1966
 Epinotia unisignana Kuznetzov, 1962
 Epinotia vagana Heinrich, 1923
 Epinotia vertumnana (Zeller, 1875)
 Epinotia vorana (Strand, 1920)
 Epinotia walkerana (Kearfott, 1907)
 Epinotia xandana (Kearfott, 1907)
 Epinotia xyloryctoides Diakonoff, 1992
 Epinotia yoshiyasui Kawabe, 1989
 Epinotia zamorata Razowski, 1999
 Epinotia zandana (Kearfott, 1907)

Synonyms
In particular during the early to mid-19th century, when little of the diversity of Epinotia was known, it was split into many smaller genera. Today however, these are generally – but not universally, e.g. regarding the supposedly monotypic Griselda, or Catastega which is here considered separate but included in Epinotia elsewhere – included here again at least pending a thorough taxonomic review. Now-invalid scientific names (junior synonyms and others) of Epinotia are:

 Acalla Hübner, [1825]
 Astatia Hübner, 1825
 Asthenia Hübner, 1825
 Cartella Stephens, 1852
 Ccalla (lapsus)
 Curtella (lapsus)
 Epinotis (lapsus)
 Evertia (lapsus)
 Evetria Hübner, 1825
 Griselda Heinrich, 1923
 Hamuligera Obraztsov, 1946
 Hikagehamakia Oku, 1974
 Hypermecia Guenée, 1845
 Lithographia Stephens, 1852
 Neurasthenia Pierce & Metcalf, 1922
 Paedisca Treitschke, 1830
 Pamplasia (lapsus)
 Pamplusia Guenée, 1845
 Panoplia Hübner, 1825
 Paragrapha Sodoffsky, 1837
 Phlaeodes Guenée, 1845
 Phloeodes (lapsus)
 Podisca (lapsus)
 Poecilochroma Stephens, 1829
 Proteopteryx Walsingham, 1879
 Steganoptera (lapsus)
 Steganoptica (lapsus)
 Steganoptycha Stephens, 1834

Halonota has also been listed as junior synonym of Epinotia. But its type species Pyralis populana is today placed in Pammene, and thus Halonota is a junior subjective synonym of the latter genus.

References

Notes

Bibliography

Eucosmini
Tortricidae genera
Taxa named by Jacob Hübner